Marina Finlay (born 1961) was an Australian actress who in 1990 left acting to be an artist.

Finlay was born and grew up in Sydney, and is a graduate of the National Institute of Dramatic Art (NIDA). She learned to paint from Judy Cassab, for whom she was a model for 30 years.

She began her career as an actor who played notable roles in television soap operas – Lucy Dunlop in The Young Doctors, Elizabeth Drysdale in Taurus Rising, Lainie Dobson in Prisoner and Laura Banning in Sons and Daughters.

In 1990 Finlay left acting to be a painter. She has had several portraits in the Portia Geach Memorial Award. In 2006 her portrait of Hugo Weaving was hung in the Archibald Prize Salon des Refusés. In 2018 she was an Archibald Prize finalist for her portrait of Peter and Susan O'Doherty, and their cat Coco.

Also in 2018, she was the subject of the portrait by another Archibald Prize finalist, Karyn Zamel. Finlay is also the subject of a portrait by Zamel which was a finalist in the 2016 Portia Geach Memorial Award.

Filmography

Film

Television

References

External links
 

1961 births
Archibald Prize Salon des Refusés
Archibald Prize finalists
Australian soap opera actresses
Living people